WSLP (100.7 FM, "Lake FM") is a commercial variety hits radio station broadcasting from Ray Brook, New York. It is owned by Jonathan Becker, through licensee North Country Radio Corp.

The station was formerly WXMR with a tagline called "Radio Bistro". The call sign was changed to WPLB on August 6, 2012; it eventually changed to a country music format, "Kickin' Country," which was simulcast with WNMR (107.1 FM, now WWFK) and competed with WOKO and WTNN.

In March 2016, the station was leased to WIRY. The arrangement allowed for the FM station to occasionally broadcast separate programming from the AM station (for instance, WIRY's regular programming could continue on the FM station while the AM station carried a sporting event). The call sign was changed to WIRY-FM on March 15, 2016.

WIRY-FM went silent on January 7, 2020, after WIRY changed ownership the previous month and the new owners ended WIRY-FM's agreement to operate it. An application was filed to move the frequency from Plattsburgh West to Ray Brook, New York.

The station changed its call sign to WPLA on July 10, 2020.

In late January 2021, WPLA moved from Plattsburgh West, New York to Ray Brook, New York. WPLA picked up the WSLP call letters on January 29, 2021, as well as the "Lake FM" variety hits format from 93.3 FM Saranac Lake, which picked up the WPLA call letters. That June, Benjamin Homel (known professionally as Randy Michaels), who owned the station through Radioactive, LLC, filed to sell the station to operator North Country Radio Corp. The sale, at a price of $45,000, was consummated on October 18, 2021.

References

External links

SLP
Radio stations established in 2011
2011 establishments in New York (state)
Adult hits radio stations in the United States